Sinocyclocheilus guanduensis is a species of cyprinid fish endemic to China.

References

guanduensis
Fish described in 2004